The Temptation of St. Anthony is an engraving, probably created c. 1470–75, by Martin Schongauer of this popular scene in 15th-century art.  In it, grotesque demons swarm around Saint Anthony the Great, bursting with movement and energy as the saint calmly resists their temptations or blows. St. Anthony is shown with some of his signature attributes, dressed in a monk's religious habit and cowl, carrying a staff with a tau-shaped handle and his bound girdle book hanging from his belt. The literary source from which this image derives is debated. The image could depict chapter 65 from Athanasius's Life of St. Anthony, where the hermit has a vision of himself floating through the air and undefined beings prevent him from ascending back to reality or it could show the ninth chapter of Athanasius's Life of St. Anthony, where St. Anthony is attacked by the devil in the form of animals and beasts in the Egyptian desert and is levitated in the air by his practice of rigorous asceticism.

Technique
In The Temptation of St. Anthony, Schongauer's engraving technique forms the image from dots, lines and areas of hatching, varying spaces between them in order to enhance the interaction of white and black. The engraving exists in two states with only minor details added to the second. Parallel and fine cross hatching can be seen in the hermit's drapery and in the texture of the devils. Contour hatching can also be seen in the drapery of the monk as well as on the battered crags in the right hand corner. Tick hatching is seen in sky which indicates the atmosphere.

The vast amount of negative space in the background accentuates St. Anthony's vulnerability while the curving and horizontal lines of the devils add energy and movement. The grotesque devils are illustrated with a mixture of body parts from different animals. Schongauer's mastery of texture is shown by giving the viewer a sense of how each beast would feel ranging from the roughness of the scales to the soft hairiness of the fur. The heavily worked foreground is balanced by progressively more isolated lines in the background, showing his control of light.

Literary source
The Temptation of St. Anthony depicts no real landscape besides a battered crag in the right hand corner leaving room for debate on what exact moment in the life of St. Anthony this scene depicts. Some scholars believe the scene depicts chapter 65 of Athanasius's Life of St. Anthony, their primary argument being that the attack takes place in the air which parallels with St. Anthony's description of ecstasy in this chapter. Chapter 65 tells the tale of when St. Anthony was about to eat dinner and suddenly felt himself carried off as if he was outside of his body. Undefined beings stood in his way preventing him from ascending and "as his guides offered resistance, the others demanded on what plea he was not accountable to them…. Then as they brought accusations but could not prove them, the way was opened up to him free and unhindered and presently he saw himself approaching so it seemed to him and halting with himself and so he was the real Anthony again." This chapter emphasizes the difference between good and bad spirits then goes on to talk about the devil and how many battles one must pass through the air in order to achieve celestial ascent.

Some scholars argue the image instead depicts chapter nine of Athanasius's Life of St. Anthony. In chapter nine Athanasius records when the saint was living in a cave in Egypt when the devil attacked him and left him half-dead. A friend found him and helped him recover and once St. Anthony had regained consciousness he asked to be sent back to fight these demons who took the shape of animals and beasts.  The British Museum which owns a copy of the print describes the hermit's ascent: "the rigorous asceticism practiced by St Anthony in the Egyptian desert allowed him to levitate in the air, where he was attacked by devils trying to beat him to the ground," and soon after the creatures were driven away by the apparitions of Christ. Texts that describe the attack provide few descriptive details, leaving room for artistic expression. In the Golden Legend, Jacobus de Voragine describes the devils as animals that attacked the saint with horns, claws and teeth.

Schongauer's monogram
Schongauer was  the first artist to sign all of his prints with a monogram. In The Temptation of St Anthony one can identify the date of the print by Schongauer's monogram. The image is one of the artist's early works. In his first ten prints his monogram is characterized by the M having vertical shanks, as opposed to the oblique shanks which appear in the rest of his prints after. The S in his earlier works is much thicker around the curves and finishes in diagonal strokes similar to roman capitals. This trait is seen in more than his first ten works but seems to decrease in his later works. It is hypothesized that Schongauer used a stamp in his first ten engravings, which he later lost and began hand writing his monogram thereafter.

Legacy
This etching inspired many artists after Schongauer including Michelangelo, who as a boy painted a copy of the engraving, according to Giorgio Vasari. The Torment of Saint Anthony. is a copy of the engraving currently in the collection of the Kimbell Art Museum. Some claim this painting is by Michelangelo, though there is no evidence for that attribution.

In addition, this engraving has served as inspiration for later paintings on the same episode, such as The Temptation of St. Anthony by Jan Brueghel the Elder, where the same scene is shown in the upper right.

Collections
The prints can be found for example in the collection of the Metropolitan Museum of Art, Art Institute of Chicago, Rhode Island School of Design Museum. For a more complete list of known prints of this engraving see the Schongauer catalogue originally by Max Lehrs.

Notes

References
 
 
 
 
Alan Shestack, Fifteenth Century Engravings of Northern Europe, # 37, 1967, National Gallery of Art (Catalogue), LOC 67-29080

Sources 

 
 
 

 

1470s works
Renaissance prints
Cultural depictions of Anthony the Great
Demons in art
15th-century engravings
Collection of the Rhode Island School of Design Museum
Catholic engraving